Rebel Yell is the second studio album by English rock singer Billy Idol, released on 10 November 1983 by Chrysalis Records. After the release of his 1982 eponymous debut album, Idol continued his collaboration with producer Keith Forsey and multi-instrumentalist Steve Stevens. The album was recorded at Electric Lady Studios in New York. Initially recording without a drummer, utilizing only the electronic drum machines LinnDrum and Roland TR-808, Forsey and Stevens later decided to hire Thommy Price to play drums on some of the songs. Musically, Rebel Yell is a new wave album with strong pop rock and hard rock influences. The cover sleeve and images were shot by Brian Griffin. Idol got the idea of the album's title after attending a party with the Rolling Stones and drinking Rebel Yell bourbon.

Background and recording
The album reunited the hit-making team of Idol, Steve Stevens and Keith Forsey after their success with Idol's 1982 solo debut, Billy Idol. Idol got the idea to name the album "Rebel Yell" after attending a party with the Rolling Stones. He explained on VH1 Storytellers that people were drinking Rebel Yell bourbon and he thought that would be a great title for an album. The title track was recorded in only three days at Electric Lady Studios in New York City. 

Working with Forsey were guitarist Steve Stevens, bassist Phil Feit and later Steve Webster, drummer Gregg Gerson, and keyboardists Judi Dozier and Jack Waldman. Drummer Thommy Price was brought in towards the end of the recording sessions.

Idol was battling Chrysalis Records over creative control, and decided to steal the master tapes; he eventually returned to the studio victorious. Forsey then informed him that he had taken the wrong tapes.

All of the singles, but particularly "Rebel Yell", "Eyes Without a Face" and "Flesh for Fantasy", would eventually have successful music videos on MTV. Idol's longtime girlfriend Perri Lister can be seen in the front row during the "Rebel Yell" video.

Release and reception

Upon its release, Rebel Yell received positive reviews from critics and was a commercial success. In the United States, it peaked at number six on the Billboard 200 and also peaked into the top ten in other countries, such as Canada, Germany, and New Zealand. The Recording Industry Association of America (RIAA) certified it double platinum for shipment of two million copies across the United States. Four singles were released from the album. The accompanying music videos for all singles received heavy airplay on television channel MTV.

In 1999, EMI Music reissued the album as part of their "Expanded" series. The new version of the album included previously unreleased bonus tracks and expanded liner notes. In 2010, audiophile label Audio Fidelity reissued a 24-karat CD remastered in HDCD by Steve Hoffman.

Track listing

Personnel
Musicians
 Billy Idol – guitar, vocals
 Steve Stevens – lead guitar, bass guitar, guitar synthesizer, synthesizer, keyboards
 Steve Webster – bass guitar 
 Judi Dozier – keyboards
 Thommy Price – drums 
 Sal Cuevas – bass guitar on "Eyes Without a Face"
 Jack Waldman – additional keyboards
 Gregg Gerson – drums on "(Do Not) Stand in the Shadows", "Rebel Yell" (Session Take), "Motorbikin'" (Session Take) and "Flesh for Fantasy" (Session Take)
 Mars Williams – saxophone on "Catch My Fall"
 Perri Lister – background vocals on "Eyes Without a Face"
 Phil Feit – bass guitar on "Rebel Yell" (Session Take), "Motorbikin'" (Session Take), and "Flesh for Fantasy" (Session Take)
 Keith Forsey – drum programming (uncredited)

Technical
 Keith Forsey – producer
 Michael Frondelli – engineer, mixing
 Dave Wittman – engineer, mixing
 Gary Hellman – engineer
 Steve Rinkoff – engineer
 Pete Thea – engineer
 George Marino – mastering
 Brian Griffin – photography
 Michael MacNeil – cover design
 Stephanie Tudor – production co-ordination
 Bob Norberg – mastering (1999 expanded edition)
 Kevin Flaherty – compilation (1999 expanded edition)

Charts

Weekly charts

Year-end charts

Certifications

References

Bibliography

 
 
 
 

1983 albums
Albums produced by Keith Forsey
Albums recorded at Electric Lady Studios
Billy Idol albums
Chrysalis Records albums